Knight Center is a Metromover station in Downtown, Miami, Florida located in the Miami Tower.

This station is located at the intersection of Southwest Second Street and Second Avenue, connected to the namesake James L. Knight Center by a glass-enclosed walkway underneath the Downtown Distributor freeway. Knight Center opened April 17, 1986 as the World Trade Center Station, and was the first elevated metro station in the world built into an existing building.

Station layout

Places of interest
James L. Knight Center
Miami Tower
Au Bon Pain
U.S. Century Bank
Dupont Plaza Hotel
Holiday Inn
Hyatt Regency Hotel
Miami Center of Commerce Shops
Met 3
Met 2 Financial Center
Ultramont Downtown Mall
Clarion Hotel
JW Marriott Hotel at Metropolitan Square
Camilla's Restaurant
Met 1
Ponto de Encontro Cafe and Restaurant
Dupont Towers
400 SE 1st Avenue Building
420 SE 1st Avenue Building
220 SE 2nd Avenue Building
240 SE 2nd Avenue Building
Acquos Tower
Epic Tower
Lynx Tower Complex

Gallery

External links
 
 MDT – Metromover Stations

Metromover stations
Railway stations in the United States opened in 1986
1986 establishments in Florida
Brickell Loop
Inner Loop
Omni Loop